Brown's Island is an artificial island on the James River in Richmond, Virginia, formed by the Haxall Canal.  Part of the city's James River Park, it is the popular venue of a large number of outdoor concerts and festivals in the spring and summer, such as the weekly Friday Cheers concert series or Dominion Riverrock.  The Rivanna Subdivision Trestle crosses over the island.

Geography
Brown's Island was formed in 1789 with the beginnings of the Haxall Canal.  For many years, there were two islands, Brown's and Johnson's Island with a spillway in between.  Today, the islands are one.

History

Pre-industrial
The island's first settler was Elijah Brown, for whom it was named.  He acquired the land in 1826.  A later owner named Neilson tried to rename the island as Neilson's Island, but it did not last.

During the American Civil War, the island was the home of the Confederate States Laboratory. The C.S. Laboratory produced ammunition, friction primers, percussion caps, and other ordnance for the Confederate war effort. On Friday, March 13, 1863, an explosion occurred in a section of the laboratory that killed forty-five individuals and left twenty-three others injured. Most of the killed and injured were young girls who were the labor force used on the island.

Industrial age
In 1894, the Richmond Union Passenger Railway opened a coal power plant on the island.  In 1899, a hydroelectric power plant on the island's east side, running off the Haxall Canal.  Virginia Power also opened a coal power plant nearby in 1936.

The trolley company's plant did not last long but reopened in 1916 as the Dixie Paper Mill.

In the 1950s and 60s, electricity production at the hydroelectric plant decreased, and ended altogether in 1968.  In 1969, the coal plant was damaged and shut down by flooding from Hurricane Camille.  In 1970, the spillway between Johnson's and Brown's Islands was closed and the islands merged.  Hurricane Agnes also flooded and closed the coal power plant in 1972, and the plant was closed altogether in 1975.

Park
In 1987, the island became part of the city's James River Parks System.  In 1993, Paul Di Pasquale's sculpture Headman was erected on the island's Eastside, depicting a man steering a James River Batteaux boat.  In 1999, the Army Corps of Engineers refurbished the Haxall canal into a canal walk. The Dominion Virginia Power coal plant was renovated in 2005 by Cordish Company. In 2014, the City released plans for Brown's Island Dam Walk and secured funding from the state of Virginia.

Sightseeing
Beside being a music venue, the island is also home to pathways and is a popular place for sightseeing.  Visible from the island are the Belle Isle, the Manchester Bridge, and the ruins of the Richmond and Petersburg Railroad Bridge.  The Rivanna Subdivision Trestle crosses the island, making it a popular destination for railfans, too.

A walkway extends south atop the old VEPCO Levee from the island into the James River, and another extends north along the Brown's Island Dam.

Today
Brown's Island has become an attraction for concerts and outdoor events, such as the Earth Day Festival, Friday Cheers concert series, and in the fall, one of Virginia's busiest and largest festivals, the Richmond Folk Festival, which draws over 200,000 people each year.

References

External links
Official site
Discover Richmond

James River (Virginia)
Artificial islands of Virginia
Landforms of Richmond, Virginia
River islands of Virginia
1789 establishments in Virginia
1863 fires in the United States
 disasters in Virginia